Fordyce House may refer to:

 Fordyce House (Hot Springs, Arkansas), listed on the NRHP in Arkansas
Fordyce–Ricks House Historic District Hot Springs, Arkansas, listed on the NRHP in Arkansas
 Fordyce House (Little Rock, Arkansas), listed on the NRHP in Arkansas